Amar Singh Chamkila (21 July 1960  8 March 1988) was an Indian singer and musician of Punjabi music. Chamkila and his wife Amarjot were killed, along with two members of their band on 8 March 1988 in an assassination which remains unresolved.

Amar Singh Chamkila is regarded as one of the best live stage performers that Punjab has ever produced and extremely popular with the village audience. His monthly bookings regularly outnumbered the number of days in the month. Chamkila is generally regarded as one of the greatest and influential Punjabi artists of all time.

His music was heavily influenced by the Punjabi village life he was surrounded by growing up. He commonly wrote songs about extra-marital relationships, coming of age, drinking, drug use, and the hot tempers of Punjabi men. He earned a controversial reputation, with his detractors regarding his music obscene, and his supporters regarding it a truthful commentary on Punjabi culture and society. 

His best-known hits include "Pehle Lalkare Naal" and his devotional songs "Baba Tera Nankana" and "Talwar Main Kalgidhar Di". Though he never recorded it himself, he wrote the widely popular "Jatt Di Dushmani" which has been recorded by many Punjabi artists. He became famous as a result of his first ever recorded song "Takue Te Takua".

Early life and career
Amar Singh Chamkila was born as Dhani Ram on 21 July 1960 in a family belonging to Chamar community in the village of Dugri near Ludhiana, Punjab, India. The youngest child of Kartar Kaur and Hari Singh Sandila , he was educated at Gujar Khan Primary School in Dugri. His aspirations of becoming an electrician were unfulfilled and he found work at a Ludhiana cloth mill.

Rise to fame

Career in music
Adopting the stage name Amar Singh Chamkila – Chamkila in Punjabi means one that glitters. Chamkila first partnered up with the female vocalist Surinder Sonia who had previously worked with Surinder Shinda. Sonia had felt sidelined after Shinda took Gulshan Komal to a tour in Canada, after which she was instrumental in pushing Chamkila to record his debut album. The pair recorded eight duets and released the album "Takue Te Takua" in 1980 with music produced by Charanjit Ahuja. The cunningly worded lyrics, which he had written himself, became hits across Punjab.

In 1980, Chamkila felt he was significantly underpaid by Surinder Sonia's manager (her husband) and decided to form his own group. Chamkila established short-lived stage partnerships with Miss Usha Kiran, Amar Noorie and others.

Chamkila was struggling to find a long-term co-singer to record songs with until fellow Punjabi singer Kuldeep Manak suggested Amarjot Kaur, who had been singing infrequently with Manak and had even featured on his latest album. Not much is known about Amarjot Kaur, except for the fact that she was previously married but left the marriage to pursue her dream of singing. She would go on to become Chamkila's permanent singing partner providing the female vocals for his duets, that is, the majority of the songs that he wrote.

Chamkila, for the most part, wrote his own lyrics, the majority of which were boyish and suggestive, yet fluent, commentaries on extramarital affairs, alcohol and drug use. The couple's appeal grew not only in the Punjab, but they quickly raced to international stardom among Punjabis abroad. Around this time, Chamkila was rumoured to be receiving more bookings than his contemporaries. The biography "Awaz Mardi Nahin"  by Gulzar Singh Shaunki found during its research that at the height of his popularity Chamkila had performed 366 shows in 365 days.

Assassination
Having arrived to perform in Mehsampur, Punjab, both Chamkila and Amarjot were gunned down as they exited their vehicle on 8 March 1988 at approximately 2PM. A gang of motorcyclists fired several rounds, fatally wounding the couple and other members of the entourage. However, no arrests were ever made with connection to the shooting and the case was never solved.

Legacy

Influence
Indian film composer Amit Trivedi called Chamkila "a legend, the Elvis of Punjab."

British Indian musician, Panjabi MC, cites Chamkila as one of his musical influences.

In popular culture
Mehsampur is a 2018 Indian mockumentary film based on Chamkila's life, produced and directed by Kabir Singh Chowdhry.

Imtiaz Ali is making a film based on his life, starring Diljit Dosanjh as Chamkila and Parineeti Chopra as his wife, Amarjot.

Discography
Chamkila's studio recordings were released by HMV as LP records and EP records during his lifetime. Though several compilation albums have been released since his death, the following CDs compiled by Saregama comprise nearly all of Chamkila's studio recordings:

 Amar Singh Chamkila Surinder Sonia (EP) [1981]
 Surinder Sonia & Amar Singh Chamkila (EP) [1982]
 Mitra Main Khand Ban Gai (EP) [1983]
 Chaklo Driver Purje Nun (EP)
 Jija Lak Minle (LP) [1983]
 Hikk Utte So Ja Ve (LP) [1985]
 Bhul Gai Main Ghund Kadna (LP) [1985]
 Rat Nun Sulah-Safaiyan (EP) [1985]
 Sharbat Vangoon Ghut Bhar Laa (LP) [1987]
 Baba Tera Nankana
 Naam Jap Le (1986)
 Talwar Main Kalgidhar Di Haan (1985)
 Yaad Aave War War (LP) [1988] (released after his death)

Posthumous albums
 2014 The Diamond

See also
List of unsolved murders

References

External links
 
 

1960 births
1988 crimes in India
1988 deaths
1988 murders in India
20th-century Indian singers
20th-century Indian male singers
Bhangra (music)
Deaths by firearm in India
Indian male singer-songwriters
Indian singer-songwriters
Male murder victims
Indian murder victims
Musicians from Ludhiana
People murdered in Punjab, India
Punjabi people
Singers from Punjab, India
Unsolved murders in India
Victims of Sikh terrorism